Vasylkiv is a city located on the Stuhna River in Obukhiv Raion, Kyiv Oblast (province) in central Ukraine. It hosts the administration of Vasylkiv urban hromada, one of the hromadas of Ukraine. A settlement with an over 1000 years history, Vasylkiv was incorporated as a city in 1796. The city has hosted the Vasylkiv Air Base since the Cold War. It is currently an industrial centre, producing electrical appliances and leather goods. Population:

History
Vasylkiv was founded in 988 CE, and fortified in the 11th century. According to the Primary Chronicle, it was the place where Vladimir the Great's numerous wives lived. After the Christianization of Kyiv, Vladimir built there a fortress and named it Vasilev, after his patron saint, Saint Basil (Vasily).

In the early 11th century, it was the birthplace of Saint Theodosius of Kiev. The Anthony and Theodosius Pechersky Church, built in the Ukrainian baroque style in the 1750s, commemorates both Theodosius and Anthony of Kiev.

In 1240, the city was destroyed by the invading Mongol Empire. It slowly recovered, and was incorporated as a city in 1796.

In 1658, the Russian military commander Yuri Baryatinsky defeated the army of hetman Ivan Vyhovsky's brother Konstantin near Vasylkiv, after the Ukrainian hetman switched sides in favour of the Polish–Lithuanian Commonwealth.

The first medical quarantine house in Ukraine was established in Vasylkiv in 1740.

Through the seventeenth and early eighteenth centuries, Vasylkiv remained  an obscure place, almost forgotten in spite of the glorious history and connection to many earlier historic events, it was put back on the map by an anecdotal story related to Catherine II of Russia. As per legend, while passing through it during the night, the carriage lost one wheel. Catherine II woke up from the sudden jerk, and asked the name of the town. When she fell asleep again, her servants repaired the wheel and the carriage moved again. She woke up again and upon learning that it is still Vasilkov, she remarked : "A large town, indeed".

Russian troops in the city took part in the failed Decembrist revolt against the Russian Empire in 1825.

Until 18 July 2020, Vasylkiv was incorporated as a city of oblast significance and served as the administrative center of Vasylkiv Raion even though it did not belong to the raion. In July 2020, as part of the administrative reform of Ukraine, which reduced the number of raions of Kyiv Oblast to seven, the city of Vasylkiv was merged into Obukhiv Raion.

In the early morning of 26 February 2022, Russian invasion forces landed near the city in an attempt to secure the Vasylkiv Air Base, resulting in the Battle of Vasylkiv. According to the city's mayor , the fighting had died down by later that day, with Ukraine still in possession of the city.

In the morning of 27 February 2022, Russian forces struck an oil depot in the city, leading to large explosions and fires.

Gallery

People from Vasylkiv
Jerry Heil (born 1995) – singer, songwriter, and YouTuber
Mykola Melnychenko (born 1966) – security services and politics personality

References

External links

 vasylkiv.today - the first independent news portal and social network of Vasylkiv 
 vasilkov.com.ua - Vasylkiv city website 
 kyiv-obl.gov.ua - Site about Vasylkiv on Kiev Oblast's Administration website 

 Vasilkov, of Kiev Guberniya, an article in Brockhaus and Efron Encyclopedic Dictionary 

 
Cities in Kyiv Oblast
Vasilkovsky Uyezd
Cities of regional significance in Ukraine
Kyiv metropolitan area